The Medford Southern Pacific Railroad Passenger Depot is a rail station located in Medford, Oregon listed on the National Register of Historic Places.

See also
 National Register of Historic Places listings in Jackson County, Oregon

References

External links

1910 establishments in Oregon
Buildings and structures in Medford, Oregon
Historic district contributing properties in Oregon
National Register of Historic Places in Jackson County, Oregon
Railway stations on the National Register of Historic Places in Oregon
Railway stations in the United States opened in 1910
Former Southern Pacific Railroad stations in Oregon
Transportation in Medford, Oregon
Transportation buildings and structures in Jackson County, Oregon